La Crosse station is an Amtrak intercity train station in La Crosse, Wisconsin, served by Amtrak's daily Empire Builder line. The train station was originally built in 1926 by the Chicago, Milwaukee, St. Paul, and Pacific Railroad (AKA "Milwaukee Road"). The station was renovated in 1997 and today is listed on the National Register of Historic Places in Wisconsin as the Chicago, Milwaukee and St. Paul Railway Depot, as well as the Milwaukee Road Passenger Depot.  The La Crosse Rail Bridge, which crosses the Mississippi River, is located just under two miles west of the La Crosse station.

Current services

The station is one of only two staffed Amtrak stations in Wisconsin, the other being Milwaukee. In 2019, the La Crosse station was the fourth most frequented station in Wisconsin, with 25,587 passengers.

, the Empire Builder departs La Crosse westbound for Seattle and Portland at 8:04pm and eastbound to Chicago at 11:37am.

The La Crosse MTU bus service does not directly serve the Amtrak station, but does stop a few blocks away on Rose Street.

Previous services

In 1910, there were 20 departures a day from the Cameron House station, with trains leaving west to Tacoma and Seattle, to Wessington Springs, South Dakota, south to Savanna, Illinois, and southeast to Chicago.

By 1955, the Milwaukee Road timetable shows that there were 12 departures per day, with 5 trains continuing to Minneapolis or beyond, 6 trains to Chicago and 1 departure to Austin, Minnesota.  The travel time to St. Paul Union Depot was as short as 2:10, while the shortest time to Chicago Union Station was 4:12.  Today, those same journeys take 2:52 and 5:08 respectively.

Over the years, service gradually decreased as federal, state and local subsidies for automobile and air travel cut into the profitability of passenger rail.  Service to Austin, MN was eliminated in 1960, post office mail contracts were cut in 1967 and by October 1970, there were only 3 daily departures from the Milwaukee Road station.

When Amtrak took over passenger rail on May 1, 1971, they immediately reduced the number of trains down to two daily departures, which has remained relatively unchanged for 50 years.

Future
As of 2021, funding is in place to add a second daily train from Chicago to St. Paul, via the La Crosse station.  Service is expected to begin in 2024.

In June 2021, Senator Jon Tester (D-Montana) added an amendment to the Surface Transportation Investment Act of 2021 which would require the Department of Transportation (not Amtrak itself) to evaluate the restoration of discontinued long-distance routes including the North Coast Hiawatha. The bill passed the Senate Commerce Committee with bipartisan support, and was later rolled into President Biden's Infrastructure Investment and Jobs Act, which was passed into law in November 2021. The report must be delivered to Congress within two years. The law also provides $2.4 billion in new funds to Amtrak's long-distance route network.

Due to passenger rail having an inherently lower environmental footprint than driving or flying, rail links are likely to improve as a result of action to mitigate the climate catastrophe.

Other stations in La Crosse
The previous Milwaukee Road station, named the "Cameron House", was a combined depot and hotel located near downtown La Crosse, next to the Freight House. The station was built in 1880 and gutted by fire on December 24, 1916, leading to its razing shortly thereafter. This event sparked a public debate about having a union station in La Crosse to serve each of the five railroads at the time. The Wisconsin Railroad Commission became involved in the discussion over many years. It became evident that such a station would likely be located in North La Crosse rather than the downtown area so that the Milwaukee Road would not have to back their trains into the La Crosse station. The issue was finally resolved in 1925, allowing the Milwaukee Road to put through plans for a new passenger depot of their own on La Crosse's North Side on St. Andrew Street, to replace the shack that had been hastily constructed after the fire while the debate of a union station raged on.

The Chicago and Northwestern Railway had a terminal station located downtown bounded by 3rd Street, 4th Street and Pine Street.  This depot was lightly used compared to the Milwaukee Road and Chicago, Burlington and Quincy Railroad stations.  The Chicago and Northwestern instead routed most traffic via their station in nearby Onalaska, including the Minnesota 400 so that trains would not have to back up into the La Crosse station.

The Chicago, Burlington & Quincy maintained two stations in La Crosse throughout their history.  One was located in North La Crosse, and continues to exist to this day, albeit no longer used as a station.  In addition, there was a station located at 2nd Street and Pearl Street in downtown La Crosse, which was replaced in 1940 with a station on the former freight bypass at the end of State Street.  These stations hosted numerous famous trains including the original Empire Builder, the Western Star, the North Coast Limited, the Mainstreeter, the Twin Cities Zephyr, the Black Hawk, and more.

Statistics

See also
 Chicago, Burlington and Quincy 4000
 La Crosse Municipal Transit Utility
 Scenic Mississippi Regional Transit
 List of intercity bus stops in Wisconsin

Gallery

References

External links

La Crosse Amtrak Station (USA Rail Guide -- Train Web)

Amtrak stations in Wisconsin
Railway stations in the United States opened in 1926
La Crosse, Wisconsin
Railway stations on the National Register of Historic Places in Wisconsin
National Register of Historic Places in La Crosse County, Wisconsin
1926 establishments in Wisconsin